Dominic Hill is Artistic Director at the Citizens Theatre, Glasgow. He took up post in October 2011.

Early life
Hill was born in Wimbledon on 22 April 1969.

Career

From  2008 to 2011 he was artistic director at the Traverse Theatre, Edinburgh. From 2003 to 2008 he was co-artistic director (with James Brining) at Dundee Rep Theatre. He previously worked as associate director at the Orange Tree Theatre, Richmond, London, where he was on the Orange Tree's Trainee Director scheme, and as assistant director at the Royal Shakespeare Company and  assistant director at Perth Theatre. He directed 
Thomas Babe's play A Prayer for My Daughter at London's Young Vic Theatre in 2008.

In 2011 Dominic was appointed artistic director of the Citizens Theatre. Since his first season, his programmes of classic texts told for contemporary audiences alongside Glasgow stories, as well as his own distinctive productions, have won praise from public and critics alike and have reaffirmed the Citizens’ role as the leading producer of courageous theatre in Scotland. Since joining the Citizens, he has directed Betrayal, King Lear, Footfalls,  Krapp’s Last Tape, Sleeping Beauty, Doctor Faustus, Seagulls, Far Away, Crime and Punishment, Miss Julie, The Libertine, Hamlet, A Christmas Carol, Fever Dream: Southside, The Choir, Endgame, The Rivals (a co-production with Bristol Old Vic and Liverpool Everyman), Hansel & Gretel, Hay Fever, Oresteia: This Restless House (2016 and presented as part of Edinburgh International Festival 2017), The Macbeths, Cinderella, Long Day's Journey Into Night and Cyrano de Bergerac - a co-production with National Theatre of Scotland and Royal Lyceum Edinburgh which also toured to Eden Court.

2018  saw the Citizens Theatre depart from their home in the Gorbals for a multi-million pound redevelopment project. During this time Dominic continues to lead the company with a touring production of The Macbeths, and a revival of 2014's A Christmas Carol, which will be presented at Tramway.

Awards
In 2016 Dominic won his 5th CATS (Critics Awards for Theatre in Scotland) award for Best Director - the most any director has won in the CATS' 14-year history. Awards include Best Director for This Restless House presented by the Citizens Theatre in association with National Theatre of Scotland (2015/16), Crime and Punishment (& Best Production 2013/14), Betrayal (2011/12) Peer Gynt, presented by Dundee Rep/National Theatre of Scotland (& Best Production 2007/08); and Scenes from an Execution (& Best Production 2003/04).

References

Living people
1969 births
British theatre directors